Nirvanopsis is a butterfly genus from the subfamily Satyrinae in the family Nymphalidae. The only species in the genus, Nirvanopsis hypnus, occurs in Indonesia.

References

Elymniini
Butterfly genera